Fight Night Round 2 (also known as Fight Night 2005) is the sequel to Electronic Arts' Fight Night 2004. It was released for PlayStation 2, Xbox, and GameCube consoles in 2005. It was the only Fight Night game in the series to be released for GameCube. The GameCube version also contains Little Mac from Nintendo's Punch-Out!! series as a playable character. This was part of a deal Nintendo had with EA Sports to have Nintendo's intellectual properties appear in EA franchises.

Gameplay
Total Punch Control, a control scheme introduced in Fight Night 2004, returns in Fight Night Round 2. With Total Punch Control, movement and most maneuvers, including punching, leaning and blocking, are performed with the left or right analog sticks, modified by the left or right triggers. For example, with the default controller configuration, moving the right thumbstick up and to the left will cause the fighter to throw a straight punch with his left hand, while holding down the right trigger while performing the same movement and then holding will cause the fighter to raise his guard to the left side of his head, ready to attempt a parry.

Fight Night Round 2 expands upon the Total Punch Control scheme with the addition of another feature, the EA SPORTS Haymaker. An EA SPORTS Haymaker is a more powerful version of one of the basic power punches (hooks and uppercuts) and is performed by pulling the analog stick back before performing the movements for a regular punch. If it connects, a Haymaker causes quite a bit of damage, can stagger the victim and may cause an instant knockdown, regardless of the victim's health or stamina status. If blocked, the Haymaker does very little to no damage while consuming a great deal of stamina from the attacking boxer. If parried, the attacker is pushed off-balance and is left vulnerable to a Haymaker or combination attack.

Other features include:

 A slightly altered interface in which both fighter's health and stamina are displayed on the bottom of the screen.
 The addition of an amateur boxing league that has the fighters wear head protection and fight in shorter matches (typically 4 rounds)
 Joe Tessitore is the new commentator.
 Illegal maneuvers, including head butts, elbow attacks, and low blows. These attacks do somewhat more damage than a normal punch and have a greater chance of opening up a cut, but repeated usage will result in point deduction and eventual disqualification.
 All-new remodeled boxing gear including gloves, foul protectors, trunks, shoes & more.
 Clinching: Any boxer may attempt to clinch his opponent at any time. If successful, both boxers will regenerate health and stamina faster as long as they are clinched. Clinching too often, however, will result in point deductions and eventually, disqualification.
 KO Moment. When a fighter's health is depleted, the game enters the KO Moment. In this mode, the camera zooms in on the fighters and the crowd and announcer are muted and the defending boxer is unable to throw punches. If the ailing fighter accumulates enough damage or is hit by a Haymaker during this period, he will be knocked down. If the defending boxer escapes a knockdown, then after some time the game will return to normal and the defending fighter will be given a small amount of health. A successful clinch by either boxer will end the KO Moment prematurely. This feature can be toggled off.
 Cutman: a mini-game that takes place after every round. In this mini-game, the player manipulates the analog sticks in order to heal damage (bruises and cuts) to their boxer's face accumulated during the course of the match. If too much damage is incurred on any one area without being healed, the fight will end in a technical knockout (TKO) in favor of the injured boxer's opponent. This feature can be turned off for regular matches and is not available at all in the amateur league.
 Current and historical boxers from all weight classes like Muhammad Ali, Sugar Ray Robinson, Roy Jones Jr., Floyd Mayweather Jr., Manny Pacquiao, Bernard Hopkins, Roberto Durán, and Evander Holyfield. This is the only game in the series to feature Mayweather.
 EA SPORTS TRAXX: featuring music by Fabolous (who appears in the video game), David Banner, Geto Boys, and Pitbull.
 The GameCube version includes the SNES game Super Punch-Out!! as a bonus game. The game's protagonist, Little Mac, can become a playable fighter in the GameCube version of Fight Night Round 2 if the player either completes every circuit in Super Punch-Out!! or creates a new character in Fight Night Round 2 with "MACMAN" as the character's first name.
 Nine venues, including Atlantic City and Flushing, Queens.

Reception

Fight Night Round 2 received favorable reviews, more so than the first game, according to video game review aggregator Metacritic.  In Japan, Famitsu gave the GameCube and PS2 versions a score of all four eights, for a total of 32 out of 40.

Contactmusic.com gave the Xbox version a score of nine out of ten and called it "the king of boxing titles". The Sydney Morning Herald gave the game a score of four stars out of five and said that "Controls work beautifully and patience and timing are crucial." The Times also gave the PS2 and Xbox versions four stars and stated: "Combinations become instinctive and defence second nature. Throw in an engrossing career mode, as well as the facility to create your own boxer, and you finally have a heavyweight boxing game." However, Detroit Free Press gave the PS2 version three stars out of four and stated that, "There are some things that made me grimace, such as the repetitive commentary and sluggish movement for online play."

The game was included on Game Informer'''s "Top 50 Games of 2005" list. IGN ranked it as the 93rd best PlayStation 2 game. The staff claimed that the series got its start with Round 2''.

References

External links
The EA official site

 Knockout Kings and Fight Night series

2005 video games
Cancelled Game Boy Advance games
PlayStation 2 games
Xbox games
GameCube games
Boxing video games
Electronic Arts games
EA Sports games
Cultural depictions of Manny Pacquiao
Video games developed in the United States